Winterbourne Railway Cutting is a 1.99 hectare geological Site of Special Scientific Interest near the village of Winterbourne, South Gloucestershire, notified in 1990.

Sources
 English Nature citation sheet for the site  (accessed 13 July 2006)

Sites of Special Scientific Interest in Avon
Sites of Special Scientific Interest notified in 1990
Railway cuttings in the United Kingdom
Rail transport in Gloucestershire
Geology of Gloucestershire